FK Ogre is a Latvian football club. They are based in the Latvian town of Ogre, Latvia. 2014-2017 played in the second-highest division of Latvian football (the Latvian First League) and the Latvian Football Cup.

On 14 July 2017 Latvian football federation informed, that In the championship of Latvia on football three more teams are disqualified. The disciplinary commission of the Football Federation of Latvia for the influence on the results of matches excluded two teams from the first league ("Jekabpils" and "Ogre") and one second league team (Riga "FC Raita") for an indefinite period from the national football championship. 
For three years, disqualified five individuals - the head coach of "Ogre" Igor Troitsky (at one time competed for the national team of Latvia), as well as four players - Alexei Kuplov-Oginsky, Denis Sokolsky, Oleg Penkovsky and Sergei Lebedev.

Players

First-team squad
As of 12 June 2016.

References

Football clubs in Latvia